Sandra Nettelbeck (born 4 April 1966) is a German film director and screenwriter, best known for her film Mostly Martha (2001).

Early life
Sandra Nettelbeck was born 4 April 1966 in Hamburg, West Germany to Uwe Nettelbeck, a German record producer, journalist and film critic, and Petra Nettelbeck, an author, film producer, and actress. In 1988, Nettelbeck began formally studying film at San Francisco State University. While studying, Nettelbeck produced several videos and two 16mm films, including A Certain Grace in 1992, which she won Best Short Film at the San Francisco International Film Festival.

Film career
Following her education, Nettelbeck worked for Spiegel TV and as a freelance editor for Premiere television between 1993 and 1994.

In 1995, Nettelbeck made her feature debut with Loose Ends.

In 1998, she wrote and directed the television film Mammamia, which won Best Screenplay and Best Film at the Ophuels Festival Saarbruecken.

In 2001, Nettelbeck wrote and directed the multiple-award winning film, Mostly Martha. Her original screenplay was remade in 2007 by Warner Brothers, Castle Rock, and Village Roadshow, and renamed No Reservations.

In 2004, she wrote and directed Sergeant Pepper.

Filmography
 A Certain Grace (1994), director, short film
 Unbeständig und kühl (1995), TV movie
 Loose Ends (1996), director, screenplay, actor
 Mammamia (1998), TV movie
 Mostly Martha (2001), director, screenplay
 Sergeant Pepper (2004), director, screenplay
 Helen (2009), director, screenplay
 Mr. Morgan's Last Love (2013), director, screenplay
  (2018), director, screenplay

Honors and awards
 2002 Créteil International Women's Film Festival Grand Prix Award for Mostly Martha
 2002 German Film Awards Outstanding Feature Film Nomination for Mostly Martha
 2002 Nantucket Film Festival Best Feature Screenplay for Mostly Martha
 2002 Lecce Festival of European Cinema Special Jury Award for Mostly Martha
 2002 Lecce Festival of European Cinema Students Jury Award for Mostly Martha
 2003 Goya Awards Best European Film for Mostly Martha
 2004 Munich Film Festival White Elephant Award for Sergeant Pepper

References

External links
 

1966 births
Film directors from Hamburg
German-language film directors
Living people
German women film directors
German women screenwriters
German screenwriters